Skórka may refer to the following villages in Poland:
Skórka, Łódź Voivodeship (central Poland)
Skórka, Greater Poland Voivodeship (west-central Poland)